is a Japanese distance swimmer. She was born on 30 June 1985 in Akasaka, Tokyo.  At the 2012 Summer Olympics, she competed in the women's marathon 10 kilometre, finishing in 12th place. In 2019, she competed in the women's 10 km event at the 2019 World Aquatics Championships in Gwangju, South Korea. She finished in 22nd place.

References

1985 births
Living people
Sportspeople from Tokyo
Japanese female freestyle swimmers
Japanese female long-distance swimmers
Olympic swimmers of Japan
Swimmers at the 2012 Summer Olympics
Swimmers at the 2016 Summer Olympics
Swimmers at the 2020 Summer Olympics
Universiade medalists in swimming
Universiade gold medalists for Japan
Medalists at the 2009 Summer Universiade
21st-century Japanese women